The following are the national records in track cycling in Ecuador, maintained by its national cycling federation, Federación Ecuatoriana de Ciclismo.

Men

Women

References

Ecuador
Records
Track cycling
track cycling